Gălăşeşti may refer to several villages in Romania:

 Gălăşeşti, a village in Budeasa Commune, Argeș County
 Gălăşeşti, a village in Suseni Commune, Argeș County